Ichinosawa Dam is a rockfill dam located in Yamagata Prefecture in Japan. The dam is used for irrigation. The catchment area of the dam is  km2. The dam impounds about 7  ha of land when full and can store 320 thousand cubic meters of water. The construction of the dam was completed in 1998.

References

Dams in Yamagata Prefecture
1998 establishments in Japan